Francis Richards is the name of:

 Francis Richards (diplomat) (born 1945), Governor and Commander-in-Chief of Gibraltar
 Francis Richards (sailor) (1873–1955), British Olympic sailor

See also
Frank Richards (disambiguation)
 Frances Richards (disambiguation), female version of the name